Everett School was a historic school building located near St. Joseph, Missouri.  It was built in 1883, and was a two-story, rectangular brick building on a stone foundation.  It had a low pitched roof and segmental arched door opening.

It was listed on the National Register of Historic Places in 1985.

References

School buildings on the National Register of Historic Places in Missouri
School buildings completed in 1883
Buildings and structures in Buchanan County, Missouri
National Register of Historic Places in Buchanan County, Missouri